Events from the year 1715 in Sweden

Incumbents
 Monarch – Charles XII

Events

 24 March - The wedding between Princess Ulrika Eleonora and Frederick of Hesse. 
 24 April - Battle of Fehmarn (1715)
 28 April - Treaty of Stettin (1715)
 18 August - Battle of Rügen (1715)
 - Hanover declares war on Sweden. 
 - Charles XII leaves Stralsund. 
 - Stralsund taken by Denmark and Prussia. 
 - Charles XII arrives in Scania. 
 - Lars Gathenhielm is ennobled. 
 - Solar eclipse over Sweden.

Births
 
 23 April - Carl Tersmeden, diarist (died 1797) 
 - Carl Fredrik Scheffer, privy councillor and writer (died 1786)

Deaths

 
 24 November - Queen Dowager Hedwig Eleonora, queen dowager (born 1636)

References

External links

 
Years of the 18th century in Sweden
Sweden